Kannadiparamba is a census town in Kannur district in the Indian state of Kerala.

Location
Kannadiparamba is a located about 5.5 - 6.5 km from Kannur town. The village is the part of Narath Grama Panchayat.

Temples
Kannadiparamba Sree Dharma Shastha Temple, one of the oldest and famous temples in Malabar is in Kannadiparamba.

Transportation
The national highway passes through Valapattanam town.  Goa and Mumbai can be accessed on the northern side and Cochin and Thiruvananthapuram can be accessed on the southern side.  The road to the east of Iritty connects to Mysore and Bangalore.   The nearest railway station is Kannur on Mangalore-Palakkad line. 
Trains are available to almost all parts of India subject to advance booking over the internet.  There are airports at Mattanur, Mangalore and Calicut. All of them are international airports but direct flights are available only to Middle Eastern countries.

Demographics
 India Census, Kannadiparamba had a population of 13,677 which constitutes 6,056 (44.3%) males and 7,621 (55.7%) females. The male female sex ratio was 1,258 higher than state average of 1,084. 
In Kannadiparamba, 12.7% of the population is under 6 years of age. Kannadiparamba had an overall literacy of 93.1% higher than national average of 59% and lower than state average of 94%. The male literacy stands at 96.7% and female literacy was 90.5%.

Religion
As of 2011 census, Kannadiparamba census town had total population of 13,677, which constitutes 53.37% Hindus, 43.53% Muslims, 2.74% Christians and 0.36% others.

Weavers
Most of the people in Kannadiparamba are weavers. They have been doing this for many years. But since 2008-2009 period handlooms have been facing a very dangerous situation. Meanwhile, so many old people stopped their companies. Now they are jobless.

References

Cities and towns in Kannur district
Villages near Mayyil